Shkelqim Krasniqi (born 18 February 1996) is a Swedish footballer who currently plays as a forward for Husqvarna.

Club career
In August 2018, Norrby sent him on loan to Husqvarna, who loaned him to Greek side Sparta in February 2019.

Career statistics

Club

Notes

References

1996 births
Living people
People from Borås
Swedish men's footballers
Sweden youth international footballers
Kosovan men's footballers
Association football forwards
GAIS players
Qviding FIF players
Norrby IF players
Husqvarna FF players
A.E. Sparta P.A.E. players
Superettan players
Ettan Fotboll players
Football League (Greece) players
Swedish expatriate footballers
Kosovan expatriate footballers
Expatriate footballers in Greece
Swedish expatriate sportspeople in Greece
Kosovan expatriate sportspeople in Greece
Sportspeople from Västra Götaland County